Chase Lake National Wildlife Refuge is located in the U.S. state of North Dakota. The majority of the land area of the refuge has been designated as wilderness and is known as the Chase Lake Wilderness. The refuge is one of the oldest in the U.S., having been set aside in 1908. The refuge has more breeding pairs of white pelicans than any other protected area in the U.S. Chase Lake NWR is managed through Arrowwwood National Wildlife Refuge Complex and in turn, a number of other refuges and wetland management districts are managed from Chase Lake including:

 Chase Lake WMD
 Chase Lake Prairie Project
 Valley City WMD
 Tomahawk NWR
 Stoney Slough NWR
 Sibley Lake NWR
 Halfway Lake NWR
 Hobart Lake NWR

Home to as many as 30,000 white pelicans, the wilderness preserves habitat for the largest single grouping of pelicans in North America. The pelicans have enjoyed a tremendous rebound from the 50 or so examples that existed in the region when first counted in 1908. Tending to nest on two large islands within the lake for protection from predators, some of the pelicans have been banded and these same birds have been found as far south as the Everglades in Florida during the winter months. Chase Lake is an alkaline lake and supports no fish species, so the pelicans rely on the plentiful tiger salamander as a food source. The white pelican is the largest of all pelicans; they can have a 10-foot (3 m) wingspan and weigh an average of 20 pounds.

Many other bird species can also be found here including herons, loons, ibises, ducks, geese, hawks and terns to name but a few. White-tailed deer, weasels, coyote and badger also inhabit the refuge.

References

External links
 
 

National Wildlife Refuges in North Dakota
Protected areas of Stutsman County, North Dakota